Disorder (Italian: Il disordine, French: Le Désordre) is a 1962 Italian-French comedy-drama film directed by Franco Brusati.

The story is a series of vignettes, in which a poor, uneducated young man (Renato Salvatori) tries to earn enough money to take his mother out of a nursing home and find a place where they both might live.

For his performance, Georges Wilson won the Golden Gate Award for Best Supporting Actor at the San Francisco International Film Festival.

Cast
 Louis Jourdan : Tom
 Susan Strasberg : Isabella
 Curd Jürgens : the father
 Alida Valli :  the mother
 Renato Salvatori : Mario
 Georges Wilson : Don Giuseppe 
 Sami Frey : Carlo 
 Jean Sorel : Andrea
 Antonella Lualdi : Mali
 Tomas Milian : Bruno
 Adriana Asti

References

External links

Italian black-and-white films
1962 comedy-drama films
1962 films
Films directed by Franco Brusati
Films scored by Mario Nascimbene
Italian comedy-drama films
1960s Italian films